World Trade Center (Lexington) (also known as Vine Center Tower) is a 17-story high-rise office building located at 301 East Main Street in the city settlement of Lexington, Kentucky.

References

See also
 Cityscape of Lexington, Kentucky

Skyscraper office buildings in Lexington, Kentucky
Lexington
Office buildings completed in 1982
Modernist architecture in Kentucky